Kavikkuyil is a 1977 Indian Tamil-language film directed by Devaraj–Mohan. The film stars Sivakumar, Sridevi and Fatafat Jayalaxmi, with S. V. Subbaiah, Rajinikanth and Senthamarai in supporting roles. It was released on 29 July 1977.

Plot 

Gopal and Radha are lovers. Murugan is the brother of Radha. He is loved by Lakshmi, but he does not reciprocate. The lovers, Gopal and Radha get intimate and later Gopal meets with an accident on a stormy night and loses his memory. The pregnant Radha waits for him. Will Murugan approve of his sister's relationship? Will Gopal regain his memory? Whether Lakshmi wins over Murugan forms the climax.

Cast 
Sivakumar as Gopal
Sridevi as Radha
Fatafat Jayalaxmi as Lakshmi
S. V. Subbaiah as Ramaiah Pillai
Rajinikanth as Murugan
Senthamarai as Chinnaiah Pillai

Production 
Kavikuyil was directed by Devaraj-Mohan. The film's story was written by R. Selvaraj while screenplay and dialogues were written by Panchu Arunachalam. The film was produced by Arunachalam's brother Subbu under the production company S. P. T. Films. The film was shot at Chikmagalur in 15 days while climax was shot at Kollimalai.

Soundtrack 
The soundtrack was composed by Ilaiyaraaja, who got established as a leading composer in Tamil cinema with this film. The lyrics of the songs are written by Panchu Arunachalam. The song "Chinna Kannan Azhaikkiraan", set in Reetigowla raga, became popular. Playback singer Sujatha Mohan made her Tamil debut with the song "Kaadhal Oviyam Kandaen", set to Hamir Kalyani raga.

Reception 
Ananda Vikatan rated the film 36 out of 100. The film failed at box-office as Sivakumar felt mixing divine elements in the story of a musician did not work well among audience.

References

Bibliography

External links 
 

1970s Tamil-language films
1977 films
Films directed by Devaraj–Mohan
Films scored by Ilaiyaraaja
Films with screenplays by Panchu Arunachalam
Indian black-and-white films